Virgin Media Television  may refer to:

 Virgin Media Television (Ireland), formerly TV3 Group, a television broadcasting company in the Republic of Ireland
 Virgin Media Television (2007–10), UK broadcasting company now named Living TV Group

See also
 Virgin Media, British telephone, television, and internet service provider
 Virgin TV, its cable TV service